Kalubhatia is a village in Sultanpur Lodhi tehsil in Kapurthala district of Punjab, India. The village is administrated by a Sarpanch who is an elected representative of village as per the constitution of India and Panchayati raj (India).

History and demographics 
The village was founded by Chaudry Kalu Bhatia who belonged to Gujjar caste. The name of village was accordingly coined in his name. He had one son named Ch Peer Bakhsh who had three sons namely Chaudhry Bandu, Chaudhry Jhandu and Chaudhry Elahi Bukhsh. Their children migrated to western Punjab in 1947 on partition, living in districts Vehari, Sheikhupura and Sarghodha as landlords and businessmen.  Most of them are highly educated and serving the Government in different capacities.

Gallery

References

List of cities near the village 
Bhulath
Kapurthala 
Phagwara 
Sultanpur Lodhi

Air travel connectivity 
The closest International airport to the village is Sri Guru Ram Dass Jee International Airport.

External links
 Villages in Kapurthala
 List of Villages in Kapurthala Tehsil

Villages in Kapurthala district